The following is a list of national American television networks and announcers who have broadcast Belmont Stakes.

Television

2020s

2010s

2000s

Combined broadcast arrangements with ABC continued until 2001, when NBC Sports took over. Under NBC, ratings continued to go up, by as much as 20 percent in some years. It did not hurt that many horses, like Funny Cide and Smarty Jones, were making Triple Crown runs during those years (although all of them failed). From 2002 to 2004, the Belmont had the highest ratings of any horse race on television.
After the 2004 race, the New York Racing Association ended its deal with NBC, citing a conflict over profit-sharing arrangements. ABC won the rights to the Belmont, and Triple Crown Productions was effectively dissolved related to bonuses and broadcast rights. The only function that Triple Crown Production still oversees is joint nomination fees and a small joint marketing effort.
In 2011, NBC Sports once again became the broadcaster of all three Triple Crown races in separate broadcast deals; including an extension to its existing rights to the Kentucky Derby and Preakness Stakes, plus establishing a new 5-year deal to broadcast the Belmont Stakes after ABC and ESPN declined to renew their previous contract. All three deals lasted through 2015, and included supplementary coverage on NBC Sports Network for all three races. The additional coverage included 14-1/2 hours of Kentucky Derby pre-race coverage including an hour and a half live special for the Kentucky Oaks and six and a half hours of Preakness Stakes pre-race coverage including a one-hour live special on the Black-Eyed Susan Stakes both carried on NBC Sports Network.
In 2022, Fox Sports announced a deal to carry the Belmont Stakes from 2023 through 2030.

1990s

Notes 
Jim McKay missed the 1995 Belmont, electing to undergo heart bypass surgery.

1980s

1970s

1960s

1950s

1940s

References 

Lists of horse racing writers and broadcasters
ABC Sports
CBS Sports
NBC Sports
Lists of announcers of American sports events
American horse racing announcers
Wide World of Sports (American TV series)
Broadcasters
CBS Sports Spectacular